Blato is a small settlement in the Municipality of Slovenske Konjice in eastern Slovenia. It lies under the northeastern slopes of Mount Konjice, just southeast of Slovenske Konjice itself. The area is part of the traditional region of Styria. The municipality is now included in the Savinja Statistical Region.

References

External links
Blato at Geopedia

Populated places in the Municipality of Slovenske Konjice